Koko Elleingand (born 25 December 1971) is an Ivorian handball player. She competed in the women's tournament at the 1988 Summer Olympics.

References

1971 births
Living people
Ivorian female handball players
Olympic handball players of Ivory Coast
Handball players at the 1988 Summer Olympics
Place of birth missing (living people)